Tokyo Airport or Tokyo International Airport may refer to one of these airports serving Tokyo, Japan:

 Narita International Airport , aka New Tokyo International Airport, the primary airport for international flights, located in Narita, Chiba, 60 km east of Tokyo
 Haneda Airport , officially Tokyo International Airport, the domestic airport with some international flights, located in Ōta, Tokyo